A mosaic is decorative art involving small pieces of glass, stone, or other material.

Mosaic may also refer to:

Literature
 Mosaic Magazine, an American Jewish magazine established in 2013
 Green Lantern: Mosaic, a 1992 DC Comics series
 Mosaic, a magazine published by the National Science Foundation from 1970 to 1992
 Mosaic a magazine published by the Wellcome Trust from 2014 to 2019
 Mosaic (Star Trek), a 1996 Star Trek: Voyager novel by Jeri Taylor

Film and television media
 Mosaic (film), a 2007 animated film
 Mosaic (murder mystery), a 2018 television series (and a 2017 mobile app)
 Mosaic: World News from the Middle East, a program on LinkTV

Music
 "Mosaic", a 2012 song by Jolin Tsai from Muse
 Mosaic (vocal band), a band from the United States
 Mosaic: A Celebration of Blue Note Records, a 2009 album by the Blue Note 7
 Mosaic (311 album), 2017
 Mosaic (Art Blakey album), 1962
 Mosaic (Love of Diagrams album), 2007
 Mosaic (Wang Chung album), 1986
 Mosaic (Woven Hand album), 2006
 Mosaics (Graham Collier album), 1971
 Mosaics (Mark Heard album), 1985
 Mosaic, a 2006 album by Lenny Breau
 Mosaic a 2010 album by Ricky Skaggs

Science
 MOSAiC Expedition, an international scientific expedition due to drift across the Arctic Ocean
 Mosaic (genetics) or mosaicism, the presence of two populations of cells with different genotypes in one individual
 Mosaic evolution, a theory of evolutionary change
 Mosaic virus, a virus which attacks ornamental and crop plants
 Ludwigia sedioides, a tropical water plant known as the mosaic flower
 Colobura dirce or mosaic, a species of butterfly

Software
 Mosaic (murder mystery), a mobile app (2017) and television series (2018)
 Mosaic (geodemography), classification software
 Mosaic (web browser), a web browser produced by the NCSA
 VMS Mosaic, a GUI web browser for use on the OpenVMS operating system
 Mosaic notation program, a music composition and notation program
 Pixelization

Companies
 Mosaic Records, a jazz record label
 The Mosaic Company, a Fortune 500 chemical company
 Mosaic Inc., a solar finance company

Other uses
 American Mosaic Journalism Prize, an award presented to freelance journalists
 Mosaic (church), a church in Los Angeles, California, U.S. 
 Mosaic (Fabergé egg), a jewelled enameled Easter egg made under the supervision of Peter Carl Fabergé in 1914
 Photographic mosaic, a picture created from tiled other pictures or photographs
 adjectival form of Moses, Biblical Hebrew leader and prophet; see Mosaic authorship

See also
 
 MOSAIC (disambiguation)
 Mosaicity consists of differently oriented crystallites
 Mosaik (disambiguation)
 Mozaic, a 2003 strategy board game
 Mozaik, a multicultural folk band
 Mozaiq (album), a 2007 album by Blood Stain Child